VF-51, Fighter Squadron 51 was an aviation unit of the United States Navy known as the "Screaming Eagles". It was originally established as VF-1 on February 1, 1943, redesignated as VF-5 on July 15, 1943, redesignated as VF-5A on November 15, 1946, redesignated VF-51 on August 16, 1948, and disestablished in March 1995. Until its disestablishment, VF-51 was the oldest fighter squadron in continuous service with the Pacific Fleet.

History

1940s 
VF-51's roots are traced back to 1927 when the Screaming Eagles insignia could be seen with the VF-3S Striking Eagles which flew the Curtis F6C-4.

In October 1947, the Screaming Eagles became the first Navy squadron to enter the jet age with delivery of the North American FJ-1 Fury; the squadron used this fighter to conduct the USN's first operational all-jet aircraft carrier landing at sea on 10 March 1948 aboard . VF-51 then transitioned to the Grumman F9F-3 Panther.

1950s 
On 3 July 1950, VF-51 launched off the USS Valley Forge CV-45 and became one of the first squadrons to take Carrier-based jets into combat. 

On that day, LTJG. Leonard H. Plog scored the first Navy air-to-air kill in the Korean War when he hit and blew off the wing of North Korean Yak-9 taking off.

Due to fears of a possible invasion of the Republic of China on Taiwan, VF-51 and the rest of the Valley Forge's Air Group and the Triumph moved south to keep watch before rejoining the war on 18 July. Future astronaut and first man to walk on the Moon, Neil Armstrong, was also a Naval Aviator in VF-51 during this period.

1960s 
During the Vietnam War, VF-51 was the first squadron to evaluate the air-to-ground capability of the F-8 Crusader, and because of this, VF-51 was picked to fly secret interdiction missions into Laos in June 1964. In 1965 VF-51 flew F-8 Crusaders off the USS Ticonderoga (CVA 14) flying missions into Vietnam and Laos. The squadron became MiG killers when they shot down two North Vietnamese MiG-21s in 1968.

1970s 
In 1971 VF-51 transitioned to the F-4 Phantom and shot down four MiG-17s. VF-51 flew from  since November 1971 until July 1975.

The purpose of this cruise on a soon-to-be scrapped carrier was to take the first squadron of United States Marine Corps AV-8A Harriers to sea.

Following this Mediterranean cruise and return to NAS Miramar, VF-51 phased out its F-4 Phantom IIs. On 16 June 1978, VF-51 transitioned to the Block 100 version of the F-14A Tomcat and their first cruise with the F-14 was in May 1979 with Carrier Air Wing 15 aboard . As part of CVW-15, VF-51 remained partnered with its sister squadron, VF-111, also flying the F-14. This cruise, originally slated to end in early December 1979, was extended by Presidential direction during the Kitty Hawk Battle Group's final port call in the Philippines in late November 1979 as a result of the seizure of the American Embassy in Iran the same month and the subsequent Iranian Hostage Crisis. Both squadrons participated in the preparatory efforts to rescue American hostages in Iran, frequently intercepting both Iranian and Soviet aircraft in the region, but departing the Indian Ocean in February 1980 and turning responsibilities over to the  Battle Group and its embarked Carrier Air Wing 8 with VF-41 and VF-84 prior to execution of Operation Eagle Claw. For this 1979–1980 deployment, VF-51 was awarded the Battle E as the top fighter squadron in the Pacific Fleet.

1980s 
During their 1981 cruise, on 7 September; NL-106 (One of VF-51's aircraft) was struck by an NL-306, an A-7E Corsair II from VA-22. While both aircraft's crew survived, a deckhand from VF-51 was killed in the accident. After that cruise with the Kitty Hawk, the air wing moved to the East coast for a short period of time, flying from the newly introduced  from March to October 1983 as the ship transited to its new homeport of NAS Alameda, California and assignment to the Pacific Fleet.

VF-51 is credited to be the first F-14 squadron to intercept Soviet Tu-22M (Tu-26) Backfire bombers, armed MiG-23 Floggers and Su-15 Flagons using the Tomcat's TCS (Television Camera Sight). The TCS allowed the crew to passively identify a target to determine if it was hostile or not.

During the 1986–1987 cruise with USS Carl Vinson, VF-51 conducted operations in the Bering Sea during the winter. In February 1990, USS Carl Vinson conducted operations in the Western Pacific and Indian Ocean. VF-51 and VF-111 took part in several exercises with regional air forces, including Singapore, Malaysia and Thailand. The air wing returned home on 29 July.

1990s 
Original Navy plans saw VF-51 and VF-111 becoming the first deployable squadrons to transition to the F-14D Super Tomcat, however these plans were cancelled in December 1991. After moving back to the Kitty Hawk with CVW-15, VF-51 participated in RIMPAC 1992 between June and July 1992. The squadron along with the rest of CVW-15 left on their 1992 WESTPAC cruise on 3 November 1992. 

After relieving the USS Ranger CV-61 and CVW-2 on 18 December, VF-51 and the rest of the air wing took up station off the coast of Somalia as part of Operation Restore Hope. After an Iraqi MiG-25 was shot down by a USAF F-16D, on 27 December 1992, the VF-51 and CVW-15 were ordered to the Persian Gulf. By 1 January, the squadron as well as other CVW-15 assets had flown a total of 51 CAP missions. On 13 January 1993, VF-51 along with VF-111 together contributed four of their F-14As as escort for an air strike targeting SAM sites in Southern Iraq. After turning over to CVW-9 and the USS Nimitz CVN-68 on 18 March, VF-51 returned back on 3 May 1993.

VF-51 and CVW-15 began their final deployment on 24 June 1994. Originally slated to be another Southern Watch deployment, the Air Wing was diverted to the Korean Peninsula in light of the Nuclear crisis and the recent death of North Korean leader Kim Il-Sung. On 11 July 1994, NL-102 (An F-14A assigned to VF-51) struck the back deck of the Kitty Hawk while landing in stormy seas and split into two pieces. Both the Pilot and RIO ejected from the fireball but the Pilot landed into the flames. Despite this, he survived although he received serve burns. Secretary of the Navy John H. Dalton visited the ship on 15 October to award those who saved the pilot's life. VF-51 arrived back from their last cruise on 22 December 1994. On 31 March 1995, the squadron was decommissioned.

Role in the Top Gun franchise

In 1985, VF-51 was one of several NAS Miramar based squadrons to participate in the filming of Top Gun. Some VF-51 and VF-111 aircraft were repainted in fictitious squadron markings for the film. To be able to film the sequences, the F-14s were fitted with cameras mounted in pods attached to the underbelly Phoenix pallets and the under wing pylons, as well as using ground mounted cameras. Late in the film, Tom Skerritt's character mentions that he flew with VF-51 off  with the main character's father, and several VF-51 pilots appear in the film credits. VF-51 never flew F-4s off Oriskany, as the Phantom was too large for that carrier; VF-51 begin to fly F-4 Phantom since 1971 on CV-43 Coral Sea.  Although there may be some plausibility in the claim as VF-51 were flying F-8s off the Oriskany during the 1965 cruise, the year mentioned in the photo shown by Maverick earlier in the film.

In the sequel Top Gun: Maverick, the character Robert "Bob" Floyd (a WSO, Topgun graduate and mission candidate) is shown with "VFA-51" insignia and helmet bag. This is a tribute to the squadron and fictitious, due to VF-51 being disestablished rather than transitioned to the F/A-18.

See also
History of the United States Navy
List of inactive United States Navy aircraft squadrons
List of United States Navy aircraft squadrons

References

External links
 VF-51 History
 VF-51 Screaming Eagles History (Dead link)

VF-51
Military units and formations disestablished in 1995